The 2010 Gerry Weber Open was a men's tennis tournament played on outdoor grass courts. It was the 18th edition of the event known that year as the Gerry Weber Open and was part of the ATP World Tour 250 series of the 2010 ATP World Tour. It took place at the Gerry Weber Stadion in Halle, Germany, from 5 June through 13 June 2010. Eighth-seeded Lleyton Hewitt won the singles title. He snapped a 15 match losing streak against Federer and it was Federer's first loss at Halle since 2002.

Finals

Singles

 Lleyton Hewitt defeated  Roger Federer, 3–6, 7–6(7–4), 6–4
It was Hewitt's first title of the year and 28th of his career.

Doubles

 Sergiy Stakhovsky' /  Mikhail Youzhny defeated  Martin Damm /  Filip Polášek 4–6, 7–5, [10–7]

Entries

Seeds

 Seedings are based on the rankings of May 31, 2010.

Other entrants
The following players received wildcards into the singles main draw:
  Andreas Beck
  Nicolas Kiefer
  Mischa Zverev

The following players received entry from the qualifying draw:
  Rohan Bopanna
  Alexandre Kudryavtsev
  Mikhail Ledovskikh
  Noam Okun

The following players received a lucky loser spot:
  Dominik Meffert
  Ruben Bemelmans

References

External links
Official website
Singles draw
Doubles draw